The 2012 Jalisco Open was a professional tennis tournament played on hard courts. It was the second edition of the tournament which was part of the 2012 ATP Challenger Tour. It took place in Guadalajara, Mexico between 12 and 18 March 2012.

Singles main-draw entrants

Seeds

 1 Rankings are as of March 5, 2012.

Other entrants
The following players received wildcards into the singles main draw:
  Daniel Garza
  Robby Ginepri
  César Ramírez
  Bruno Rodríguez

The following players received entry from the qualifying draw:
  Roman Borvanov
  Érik Chvojka
  Robert Farah
  Miguel Ángel Reyes-Varela

Champions

Singles

 Thiago Alves def.  Paolo Lorenzi, 6–3, 7–6(7–4)

Doubles

 James Cerretani /  Adil Shamasdin def.  Tomasz Bednarek /  Olivier Charroin, 7–6(7–5), 6–1

External links
Official website
ITF Search
ATP official site

Jalisco Open
Jalisco Open
Mex